The Chief Justice of the Province of New Brunswick, Canada holds the highest office within the Province's judicial system. The Chief Justice is a member of the Court of Appeal, the highest court in the Province which includes five other judges plus any former judge of the Court of Appeal who is a supernumerary judge and any former Chief Justice of New Brunswick who is a judge or a supernumerary judge.

The Court of Appeal generally sits in the Province's capital, Fredericton.

The Governor General in Council appoints the Chief Justice and the other judges to the Court of Appeal.

Historical list of Chief Justices of New Brunswick:

References

External links
New Brunswick Court of Appeal

Judges in New Brunswick
New Brunswick courts
Lists of Canadian judges
Lists of political office-holders in New Brunswick